Prakash Koirala is a Nepalese politician and former Cabinet minister who held the portfolios of Environment, Science and Technology. He was elected to the Pratinidhi Sabha in the 1999 election on behalf of the Nepali Congress. He is the son of former Nepalese prime minister Bishweshwar Prasad Koirala, and is the father of Bollywood actress Manisha Koirala and an actor Siddharth Koirala.

On 15 July 2005, he was appointed as the cabinet minister of Nepal for Environment, Science and Technology in the royal cabinet of erstwhile King Gyanendra, when  Sher Bahadur Deuba government was sacked.

References

Living people
Year of birth missing (living people)
Nepali Congress politicians from Koshi Province
St. Xavier's Patna alumni
P
Children of national leaders
Nepal MPs 1991–1994
Nepal MPs 1999–2002
Children of prime ministers of Nepal